The Sámi pavilion is an art exhibition in the Nordic pavilion of the 2022 Venice Biennale.

Further reading 

 
 
 
 
 https://www.frieze.com/article/sami-artists-fighting-self-determination-venice

April 2022 events in Italy
59th Venice Biennale
Sámi culture